Football Club Internazionale Milano is an Italian association football club based in Milan, Lombardy. The club was formed on 9 March 1908 to allow the foreign players to play in Italy. Inter played its first competitive match on 10 January 1910 against their cross-town rivals Milan, in which they lost 3–2. The club won its first title in 1910 – the 1909–10 Italian Football Championship. In total, the club has won nineteen league titles along with eight Coppa Italia and six Supercoppa Italiana. They have also been crowned champions of Europe on three occasions by winning two European Cups back-to-back in 1964 and 1965 and then another in 2010. The club experienced the most successful period in their history from 2006 to 2010, in which it won five successive league titles, equaling the all-time record at that time, by adding three Italian Cups, three Italian Supercups, one UEFA Champions League and one FIFA Club World Cup. During the 2009–10 season, Inter under José Mourinho become the first and only Italian team to win the Treble and the second team to win five trophies in a calendar year.
 
Helenio Herrera and Roberto Mancini are the most successful managers in terms of number of trophies won. Helenio Herrera won three Serie A titles, two European Cups and two Intercontinental Cups. Herrera is also the club's longest-serving manager with nine seasons, eight of which were consecutive. Roberto Mancini won three Serie A titles, two Coppa Italia and two Supercoppa Italiana.

List of managers

Statistics 

 

As of 14 March 2023

Trophies

Footnotes

References 

Managers
 
Internazionale
Managers